After power transformation, on 15 August 1947, Jawaharlal Nehru assumed office as the first Prime Minister of India and chose fifteen ministers to form the First Nehru ministry.

Background
The Constituent Assembly was set up while India was still under British rule, following negotiations between Indian leaders and members of the 1946 Cabinet Mission to India from the United Kingdom. The provincial assembly elections had been conducted early in 1946. The Constituent Assembly members were elected to it indirectly by the members of these newly elected provincial assemblies, and initially included representatives for those provinces which came to form part of Pakistan, some of which are now within Bangladesh. The Constituent Assembly had 299 representatives, including nine women.

The Interim Government of India was formed on 2 September 1946 from the newly elected Constituent Assembly. The Indian National Congress held a large majority in the Assembly, with 69 percent of all of the seats, while the Muslim League held almost all of the seats reserved in the Assembly for Muslims. There were also some members from smaller parties, such as the Scheduled Caste Federation, the Communist Party of India, and the Unionist Party. In June 1947, the delegations from the provinces of Sindh, East Bengal, Baluchistan, West Punjab, and the North West Frontier Province withdrew, to form the Constituent Assembly of Pakistan, meeting in Karachi. On 15 August 1947, the Dominion of India and Dominion of Pakistan became independent nations, and the members of the Constituent Assembly who had not withdrawn to Karachi became India's Parliament. Only 28 members of the Muslim League finally joined the Indian Assembly. Later, 93 members were nominated from the princely states. The Congress thus secured a majority of 82%.

Jawaharlal Nehru took charge as the first Prime Minister of India on 15 August 1947, and chose 15 other members for his cabinet. Vallabhbhai Patel served as the first Deputy Prime Minister until his death on 15 December 1950. Lord Mountbatten, and later C. Rajagopalachari, served as Governor-General until 26 January 1950, when Rajendra Prasad was elected as the first President of India.

Cabinet members 

There were members from Hindu, Muslim, Christian, Sikh and Parsi communities represented in India's first ministry. There were two members from the Dalit community represented as well. Rajkumari Amrit Kaur was the only female Cabinet minister. The following is a list of the ministers in the first Cabinet.

Key
  Died in office
  Resigned

|}

References

Further reading
 Josy Joseph (5 June 2008) Star wars in Nehru cabinet – DNA

 
1947 establishments in India
Cabinets established in 1947
Council of Ministers of India
Indian union ministries
Ministries of George VI
1952 disestablishments in India
Cabinets disestablished in 1952